Eldorado is a city in the center-northeast of the province of Misiones, Argentina. It is located on the left-hand (eastern) banks of the Upper Paraná River, on National Route 12, about 100 km from the Iguazú Falls and 206 km from the provincial capital Posadas, on the Argentina-Paraguay border.

Eldorado was founded on 29 September 1919 as a rural settlement and a port on the Paraná by German-born Adolfo Julius Schwelm, naturalised British subject, who named it as a reference to the legend of El Dorado. The town was the center of the European immigrant colonization of the area (which included groups of people from Germany, Switzerland, Poland, Denmark, England, and others).

The region's economy is based on agriculture, producing tung, oranges, grapefruit and yerba mate. Tourism also plays a part, with main activities being sailing, sports fishing (golden dorado), and sports hunting (tapir, deer, wild boars). Eldorado has an airport.

Towns and villages 
9 de Julio (Misiones)

References

 Municipality of Eldorado — Official website. 
 
 Eldorado at WelcomeArgentina.

Populated places in Misiones Province
Populated places established in 1919
Cities in Argentina
Argentina
Misiones Province